Costic F. "Ike" Borsavage (July 25, 1924 – January 10, 2014) was an American basketball player.

He played collegiately for the Temple University.

He was selected by the Philadelphia Warriors in the 5th round of the 1950 NBA draft.

He played for the Warriors (1950–51) in the NBA for 24 games.

In 2007, he was a member of the Wrightstown borough council from the Republican Party.

References

External links

1924 births
2014 deaths
American men's basketball players
Basketball players from Pennsylvania
Philadelphia Warriors draft picks
Philadelphia Warriors players
Temple Owls men's basketball players
Wilkes-Barre Barons players
Centers (basketball)
Power forwards (basketball)